Alan Caddy (2 February 1940 – 16 August 2000) was an English guitarist, arranger, record producer and session musician.

Biography
He was born in Chelsea, London, and educated at Emanuel School, and the Royal Academy of Music where he learned the violin.  He was lead guitarist in the first, seven-man line-up of Johnny Kidd & the Pirates, and was the only member to remain with Kidd when the singer re-invented the "stage look" of the act, alongside bassist Brian Gregg and drummer Clem Cattini.  While searching for a suitable rhythm guitarist, Caddy's playing evolved into a style that played rhythm and lead in a chunkier style.  The band felt this worked and Kidd liked the way he and his Pirates looked onstage, with him in front of Cattini, flanked by Gregg and Caddy, all in full pirate regalia.

This line-up contributed to, and recorded "Shakin' All Over".  Although a versatile and accomplished lead guitarist, Caddy also played rhythm on both tracks for the resulting single, the band bringing in their friend, Scottish guitarist Joe Moretti.  Moretti played the classic lead riffs and solo.  "Shakin' All Over" was originally the B-side to a revival of "Yes Sir, That's My Baby", but the record company flipped the 45 and the new topside went to number 1 in the UK Singles Chart.  The same set-up was repeated for the follow-up, "Restless" which reached number 22.  Caddy, Gregg and Cattini left Kidd after the failure of their 1961 single "Please Don't Bring Me Down" to join Tommy Steele's brother Colin Hicks as his Cabinboys for what turned out to be a disastrous tour to Italy.

After returning to Britain, Caddy and Cattini answered an advert for a new session group to work for Joe Meek, who needed a new house band now that the Outlaws were spending more time on the road backing some of his artists (such as Buddy Holly impersonator Mike Berry) as well as in their own right.  When the tone-deaf Meek needed help to translate his songwriting efforts to his artists, he turned to Caddy who would listen to the off-tune demo recordings (usually over previously used backing tracks) and turn them into complete pieces for others to learn.  With Heinz Burt on bass, George Bellamy on rhythm guitar and Roger Lavern on keyboards, this group backed John Leyton and others in the studio before evolving into the Tornados, whom Meek launched as an act in their own right in late spring 1962 with "Love And Fury".  For the notes on Trojan's Complete CD set, Cattini thought of this track as being the first ever disco record.

The Tornados became the first British group to score a number 1 on both sides of the Atlantic with the Joe Meek produced hit single, "Telstar" in 1962.  After Meek removed Heinz for a solo career, Brian Gregg came in, but further hit success tailed off with each subsequent single, bowing out with "Dragonfly" in late 1963.  Caddy played the melody on this topside, as a change to Laverne's organ/clavioline combination, which had been used on all their singles up till then.  The remaining original members gradually left – Caddy himself leaving in early 1964 – and soon, the line-up would feature all-new musicians.

Caddy released one collectable solo single "Tornado" / "Workout" (HMV 1286, 1964). He also co-founded Sound Venture Productions, enabling him to get properly involved with arranging and producing and co-formed the World Artists label with ex-Meek crooner Don Charles. This label released a record in the US by the Moments (Steve Marriott's pre Small Faces band), a cover of the Kinks' "You Really Got Me" in a bid to beat the original into their charts. It failed to chart, but the B-side was a Caddy original.  "Money Money" was described in one review as being a "handsome slice of embryonic R&B complete with harmonica, finger clicks and Steve's first recorded yell of "Come On Children!"

Caddy later worked as music director and arranger for Polydor Records and for the singer Steve Rowland.  However, Rowland's career failed to ignite and instead he became a producer for the Fontana record label, later calling in Caddy to arrange material for Dave Dee, Dozy, Beaky, Mick & Tich, a group Joe Meek had turned down.  Caddy also played on sessions and worked on arrangements for Tony Blackburn, Elkie Brooks, the Spencer Davis Group, Kiki Dee, the Pretty Things and Dusty Springfield.

An alcoholic for much of his adult life, Caddy made his last public appearance at the Joe Meek Reunion Concert at Lewisham in 1991, along with the rest of the original Tornados who inevitably played "Telstar".  He died in 2000.

External links
Obituary from "The Guardian"
Alan Caddy with The Pirates

1940 births
2000 deaths
English rock guitarists
English session musicians
People from Chelsea, London
British music arrangers
20th-century English musicians
20th-century British guitarists
Lead guitarists
Johnny Kidd & the Pirates members
People educated at Emanuel School
Alumni of the Royal Academy of Music